Fried potatoes are a dish or a component of other dishes (such as Bauernfrühstück) essentially consisting of potatoes  which have been fried or deep-fried in hot cooking oil often with the addition of salt and other seasonings. They are often served as a side dish.

Health considerations 

Acrylamide is formed from asparagine and reducing sugars in potatoes, so choosing potato varieties with lower levels of these compounds can reduce acrylamide formation, along with not refrigerating potatoes and only frying them until they are golden, not brown.

Nutrition
French-fried potatoes in vegetable oil are 63% carbohydrates, 29% fat, and 6% protein. A 100-gram reference amount supplies 539 calories and is a rich source (20% or more of the Daily Value) of several B vitamins, sodium, phosphorus, and potassium.

List of fried potato dishes 
 French fries/chips, also known as “French-fried potatoes”
 German fries (Bratkartoffeln)
 Hash browns – grated or shredded potatoes that are fried in oil
 Potato cake/patty – further processed hash browns that a pressed into patty-like finger food 
 Home fries – referred to as fried potatoes (UK and regional US), it is a basic potato dish made by pan- or skillet-frying chunked, sliced, wedged or diced potatoes that are sometimes unpeeled and may have been par-cooked by boiling, baking, steaming, or microwaving
 Lyonnaise potatoes – a French dish prepared with sliced pan-fried potatoes and thinly sliced onions that are sautéed in butter with parsley
 Papa rellena (English: stuffed potatoes) – a Latin American dish prepared using a baked potato dough that is stuffed with various fillings
 Patatas bravas – a Spanish dish typically prepared using white potatoes that have been cut into irregular shapes of about 2 centimeters, then fried in oil and served warm with a sauce such as a spicy tomato sauce or an aioli. 
 Potato chips/crisps — thin sliced potatoes that have been peeled, vacuum-fried/deep-fried in oil and flavored. 
 Potato pancake – shallow-fried pancakes of grated or ground potato, flour and egg, often flavored with grated garlic or onion and seasoning.
 Boxty – a traditional Irish potato pancake
 Latke – a potato pancake of traditional Jewish cuisine. Often made with matzo meal, egg, potato purée and served with apple sauce or sour cream.
 Potato waffle – can be fried, baked or grilled
 Potatoes O'Brien – consists of pan-fried potatoes along with green and red bell peppers
 Rösti – a Swiss dish
 Tater tots—grated potatoes formed into bite-sized pieces

See also 

 List of deep fried foods

References 

Potato dishes
Fried vegetables